Autreyville is an unincorporated community in Colquitt County, in the U.S. state of Georgia.

History
Autreyville was named after D. A. Autrey, a local merchant. A post office called Autreyville was established in 1893, and remained in operation until 1951. In 1900, the community had 136 inhabitants. The community once had a schoolhouse, now defunct.

References

Unincorporated communities in Colquitt County, Georgia
Unincorporated communities in Georgia (U.S. state)